The 1899 Virginia Orange and Blue football team represented the University of Virginia as an independent during the 1899 college football season. Led by first-year head coach Archie Hoxton, the Orange and Blue compiled a record of 4–3–2.

Schedule

References

Virginia
Virginia Cavaliers football seasons
Virginia Orange and Blue football